Vălișoara is a commune in Hunedoara County, Romania.

Vălișoara may also refer to the following places in Romania:

 Vălișoara, a village in Livezile Commune, Alba County 
 Vălișoara, a village in Bucoșnița Commune, Caraș-Severin County
 Vălișoara, a village in Săvădisla Commune, Cluj County
 Vălișoara, a village in Balșa Commune, Hunedoara County
 Vălișoara, a village in Sânger Commune, Mureș County
 Vălișoara, a village in Letca Commune, Sălaj County
 Vălișoara, a tributary of the Timiș in Caraș-Severin County

See also 
 Valea (disambiguation)